John Cornwell  may refer to:

Jack Cornwell (1900–1916), British sailor posthumously awarded the Victoria Cross for gallantry at the Battle of Jutland
John J. Cornwell (1867–1953), American politician, Governor of West Virginia
John Cornwell (writer) (born 1940), British journalist, author, and academic
John Cornwell (footballer) (born 1964), English footballer
John Cornwell (artist) (1930–2020), Australian artist

See also
 John Cornwall (disambiguation)